The Shaka era (IAST: Śaka, Śāka) is a historical Hindu calendar era (year numbering), the epoch (its year zero) of which corresponds to Julian year 78. 

The era has been widely used in different regions of India as well as in SE Asia.

History

There are two Shaka era systems in scholarly use, one is called Old Shaka Era, whose epoch is uncertain, probably sometime in the 1st millennium BCE because ancient Buddhist and Jaina inscriptions and texts use it, but this is a subject of dispute among scholars. The other is called Saka Era of 78 CE, or simply Saka Era, a system that is common in epigraphic evidence from southern India. A parallel northern India system is the Vikrama Era, which is used by the Vikrami calendar linked to Vikramaditya.

The beginning of the Shaka era is now widely equated to the ascension of king Chashtana in 78 CE. His inscriptions, dated to the years 11 and 52, have been found at Andhau in Kutch region. These years are interpreted as Shaka years 11 (89 CE) and 52 (130 CE). A previously more common view was that the beginning of the Shaka era corresponds to the ascension of Kanishka I in 78 CE. However, the latest research by Henry Falk indicated that Kanishka ascended the throne in 127 CE. Other historical candidates have included rulers such as Vima Kadphises, Vonones, and Nahapana.

According to historian Dineshchandra Sircar, the historically inaccurate notion of "Shalivahana era" appears to be based on the victory of the Satavahana ruler Gautamiputra Satakarni over some Shaka (Western Kshatrapa) kings. An account claims that the emperor Shalivahana, grandson of legendary emperor Vikramaditya defeated the Shakas in 78 CE, and the Shaka era marks the day of this conquest. This legend has been mentioned in the writings of Brahmagupta (7th century CE), Al-Biruni (973–1048 CE), and others. Over time, the word "Shaka" became generic, and came to be mean "an era"; the era thus came to be known as "Shalivahana Shaka".

Usage

The earliest known users of the era are the Western Satraps, the Shaka (Indo-Scythian) rulers of Ujjain. From the reign of Rudrasimha I (178–197), they recorded the date of minting of their coins in the Shaka era,  usually written on the obverse behind the king's head in Brahmi numerals.

The use of the calendar era survived into the Gupta period and became part of Hindu tradition following the decline of Buddhism in India. It was in widespread use by the 6th to 7th centuries, e.g. in the works of Varāhamihira and Brahmagupta, and by the 7th century also appears in epigraphy in Hindu Southeast Asia.

The calendar era remained in use in India and Southeast Asia throughout the medieval period, the main alternative era in traditional Hindu timekeeping being the Vikram Samvat era (56 BC). It was used by Javanese courts until 1633, when it was replaced by Anno Javanico, a hybrid Javanese-Islamic system. It was adopted as the era of the Indian national calendar (also known as "Śaka calendar") in 1957 but not widely used.

The Shaka epoch is the vernal equinox of the year AD 78. The year of the official Shaka Calendar is tied to the Gregorian date of 22 March every year, except in Gregorian leap years when it starts on 21 March. The Lunisolar Shalivaahana Saka continues to be used widely in Southern and Western India for many religious and some secular purposes such as sowing and agriculture.

See also
 Vikram Samvat
 Indian national calendar
 Gregorian calendar
 Rudrasimha I

References

Citations

Sources

 

 

Hindu calendar
Calendar eras